Veckholm Church is a Lutheran church in the Archdiocese of Uppsala in Uppsala County, Sweden.

History and architecture
The oldest parts of the church date from the 13th century. It was later enlarged, and in the 15th century the church was vaulted, a church porch and a vestry was added and the church again enlarged. In the 17th century, a grandly designed burial chapel for the De la Gardie family was added to the church, designed by Nicodemus Tessin the Elder. The chapel was never entirely finished: it reached its current height in 1675 and work was then suspended. A temporary roof was not replaced with a more permanent one until the 1790s.

The church is noteworthy for its rich internal decoration. The altarpiece is made in the atelier of Jan Borman and dates from the early 16th century. The triumphal cross is from the 15th century, while the baptismal font is from the 12th century. The church also houses an unusual carved wooden bench, dating from the 16th century. The pulpit is from 1640, and the organ from the 1660s with later additions. In addition, the burial chapel houses the sculptured grave of Fredrik Pontus De la Gardie and a large monument over Johan De la Gardie and his wife Catharina Oxenstierna.

Gallery

References

External links

 Official site (in Swedish)

Churches in Uppsala County
Churches in the Diocese of Uppsala
13th-century churches in Sweden
Churches converted from the Roman Catholic Church to the Church of Sweden